The Boston Blues were a Negro league baseball team in 1946 and part of Branch Rickey's U.S. Baseball League. The league did not last long due to scheduling problems as the Blues led their division. The star players on the club were catcher Johnny Powell and pitcher Leroy Bennett who both played in Negro League All-Star Games.

References

1946 establishments in Massachusetts
1946 disestablishments in Massachusetts
Blues
Baseball teams established in 1946
Baseball teams disestablished in 1946
Defunct baseball teams in Massachusetts
Negro league baseball teams